During 2011 the Australian radio station ABC Classic FM held a Classic 100 Twentieth Century countdown.

Voting for the countdown was held between 1 October 2011 and 23 October 2011, with each listener permitted to vote for up to 10 pieces of music that were "composed since 1900".

The broadcasting of the results of the countdown began on 26 November 2011 and concluded on 3 December 2011 (with the top-ranked works played live by the Adelaide Symphony Orchestra in concert at the Adelaide Festival Theatre).

Countdown results
The results of the countdown were as follows:

Results ranked by year

Programming
For more information about the works broadcast (including performers and recording details), see ABC Classic FM's programming notes:
Day 1: Numbers 100 to 88
Day 2: Numbers 87 to 78
Day 3: Numbers 77 to 66
Day 4: Numbers 65 to 55
Day 5: Numbers 54 to 41
Day 6: Numbers 40 to 29
Day 7: Numbers 28 to 19
Day 8: Numbers 18 to 1

By composer
The following 48 composers were featured in the countdown:

See also
Classic 100 Countdowns

Notes

References

External links

Classic 100 Countdowns (ABC)
2011 in Australian music